"Casting the Runes" is a short story written by the English writer M.R. James. It was first published in 1911 as the fourth story in More Ghost Stories, which was James' second collection of ghost stories.

Plot summary
Mr. Edward Dunning is a researcher for the British Museum. At the beginning of the story he has recently reviewed The Truth of Alchemy by a Mr. Karswell, an alchemist and occultist. Afterwards he begins seeing the name John Harrington displayed wherever he goes. He learns that Harrington also reviewed Karswell's work and died in a freak accident not long after. 

Harrington's brother helps Dunning to discover that Karswell cursed both men by slipping them a piece of paper with some runes on it. They deduce that the curse, once cast, will cause the bearer to die in three months. They track down Karswell a day before the curse is set to kill Dunning and manage to return the runes to him. Karswell dies the next day, killed by a stone that falls from scaffolding around St. Wulfram's Church in Abbeville.

Adaptations
The 1957 film Night of the Demon (directed by Jacques Tourneur) is an adaption of this story. In this version, the central character is called Dr John Holden (played by Dana Andrews). Holden is an American psychologist who plans to expose occultist Julian Karswell (Niall MacGinnis) as a charlatan, only to discover Karswell's powers are real and that he has put a curse on Holden. 

The story has been adapted twice for British television. The first was in 1968 as an episode of the anthology series Mystery and Imagination (Season 3, episode 1, 1968) with John Fraser as Dunning and Robert Eddison as Karswell. In 1979, the story was adapted again as Casting the Runes, an episode of ITV Playhouse (Season 11, episode 9). In the 1979 version, the central protagonist is a woman, Prudence Dunning (played by Jan Francis), the producer of an investigative television programme which is critical of an occultist named Karswell (played by Iain Cuthbertson), and soon finds that Karswell has a curse put upon her. No complete copies of the 1968 version are known to exist, but the 1979 version has been released on DVD.

"Casting the Runes" has also been adapted several times for radio. The first was in 1947 by CBS for their radio series Escape. CBS produced a second version in 1974 for their CBS Radio Mystery Theater show. In 1981, BBC Radio 4 produced a loose adaptation called "The Hex".

References

External links

 
Full text of "Casting the Runes"

Alternative LibriVox reading of the story
A Podcast to the Curious: Episode 12a - Casting the Runes

1911 short stories
Short stories adapted into films
Short stories by M. R. James
Horror short stories
Fiction about alchemy
Fiction about curses